Malicorne is a former commune in the Yonne department in Bourgogne-Franche-Comté, north-central France. On 1 January 2016, it was merged into the new commune of Charny-Orée-de-Puisaye.

Geography

The village lies on the right bank of the Branlin, which flows northward through the commune before its confluence with the Ouanne at Saint-Martin-sur-Ouanne. The river Ouanne makes up most of the commune's north-eastern border.

See also

Communes of the Yonne department

References

Former communes of Yonne